Tilloclytus balteatus is a species of longhorn beetle in the Cerambycinae subfamily. It was described by Chevrolat in 1860. It is known from eastern Mexico, Honduras, and Costa Rica.

References

Anaglyptini
Beetles described in 1860